Jessica "Jess" Jones (born August 30, 1990) is a Canadian ice hockey player,  affiliated with the Toronto chapter of the Professional Women's Hockey Players Association (PWHPA). Jones was a member of the Canadian national under-18 team that competed at the inaugural IIHF U18 Women's World Championship in 2008. She was selected to compete in the 2017 CWHL All-Star Game, the third All-Star Game in her Canadian Women's Hockey League (CWHL) career.

Playing career

Hockey Canada
Jones was a member of the Team Ontario Red squad that captured its fourth consecutive gold medal at the 2007 Canadian U18 national women's ice hockey championships. With the national under-18 team, Jones would gain three points in a 17–0 win against Finland on January 9, 2008. Two of her teammates from Team Canada's U18 roster in 2008 would one day be teammates on the Brampton Thunder; Laura McIntosh and Laura Fortino.

NCAA
Jones played with the Mercyhurst Lakers women's ice hockey program in the College Hockey America (CHA) conference of the NCAA Division I from 2008 to 2012. She appeared in 138 games and amassed 154 points. In her senior season, she logged a career-best 48 points, complemented by six power play goals.

Europe
After graduating from Mercyhurst, Jones opted to play in the Elite Women's Hockey League (EWHL), signing with the league’s lone Belarusian team, HK Pantera Minsk. She was the only Canadian on a roster dominated by Belarusian and Russian players but which also included expatriates Galina Larionova of Kazakhstan, Martina Veličková of Slovakia, Tatyana Chizhova and Nataliya Kozachuk of Ukraine, and Kelly Buchta and Kathryn Walker of the United States. Jones finished the season as the team's leading scorer, logging 28 goals and 25 assists for 53 points in just 19 games played and posting an excellent +43 plus-minus which tied for team best with Pantera’s second leading scorer, Lidiya Malyavko. That season, Jones and her teammates would compete in the EWHL Super Cup, where she logged eight points as Pantera won the Super Cup for the first time.

CWHL
Jones was selected in the first round, third overall by the Brampton Thunder in the 2013 CWHL Draft. She made her CWHL debut with the Thunder on November 2, 2013, against the Boston Blades. The following day, Jones scored her first CWHL goal in a rematch with the Blades against Brittany Ott, assisted by Lindsey Vine and Sarah Moe. Her first multi-point game was logged on February 8, 2014, against the Montreal Stars. Jones logged nine points in 23 games played during her rookie CWHL season in 2013–14. 

During the 2014–15 season, Jones scored the first game-winning goal of her CWHL career on November 15, 2014, against the Montreal Stars; a power play goal scored on Stars' goaltender Charline Labonté in the second period, with assists from Jennifer Kirk and Dania Simmonds. In addition, she was among the competitors at the 1st Canadian Women's Hockey League All-Star Game, contested at Toronto's Air Canada Centre. At the conclusion of the 2014–15 campaign, Jones was the leading scorer for the Thunder with 16 points, finishing one point ahead of Laura Fortino for the lead. 

At the 3rd CWHL All-Star Game, Jones and Jillian Saulnier both scored a hat-trick, becoming the first competitors in CWHL All-Star Game history to achieve the feat.

Jones tied for first in the league scoring race with 37 points in the 2016–17 CWHL season and co-won the Angela James Bowl with Marie-Philip Poulin. Statistically, her finest single-game performance was a five-point effort in a January 21, 2017 road game against the Boston Blades, which saw the Thunder prevail by an 8-0 margin. Jones scored a goal in each period and logged assists on a first period goal by Rebecca Vint and on Laura Fortino's fourth goal of the season, scored in the second period.

NWHL
On August 31, 2017, Jones signed with the Buffalo Beauts as a free agent, joining former Thunder teammates Sarah Edney and Rebecca Vint who also signed with the Beauts.

Career statistics

Regular season and playoffs

International

Awards and honours
 2009 College Hockey America All-Rookie Team
 2009 College Hockey America All-Tournament Team
 College Hockey America Player of the Week (Week of March 1, 2010)
 CWHL All-Star Game (2014, 2016, 2017)
 Finalist, 2017 CWHL Most Valuable Player
 2017 Angela James Bowl (co-winner with Marie-Philip Poulin)

References

External links 

 

Living people
1990 births
Buffalo Beauts players
Brampton Thunder players
Canadian women's ice hockey forwards
Ice hockey people from Ontario
Mercyhurst Lakers women's ice hockey players
Professional Women's Hockey Players Association players
European Women's Hockey League players